Liechtenstein competed at the 1968 Summer Olympics in Mexico City, Mexico.

Results by event

Athletics

Xaver Frick Jr.
Men's 800 metres — Heats: 1:52.6 s (did not advance)
Men's 1500 metres — Heats: 4:15.3 s (did not advance)

Franz Biedermann
Decathlon — 6323 points (→ 18th place)

References
Official Olympic Reports

Nations at the 1968 Summer Olympics
1968
1968 in Liechtenstein